The Feast of the Black Nazarene (Filipino: Pista ng Itím na Nazareno), also known as the Traslación after the mass procession associated with the feast, is a religious festival held in Manila, Philippines that is centered around the Black Nazarene, an image of Jesus Christ. It is celebrated annually on January 9.

Background

History
The Feast of the Black Nazarene commemorates the anniversary of the translation or the transfer of the image from its original location at a church in modern-day Luneta Park to Quiapo. The image was brought to the Church of San Juan Bautista in Bagumbayan (now Luneta) until May 31, 1606, by Augustinian Recollect priests. In 1608, the icon was enshrined at the Recollect church of San Nicolás de Tolentino in Intramuros. It was moved to the Saint John the Baptist Church, which is now commonly referred to as the Quiapo Church, on January 9, 1787. The "solemn transfer" eventually became the date of the Feast of the Black Nazarene.

Image

Names and characterization
There are opposing views on whether to consider the Feast of the Black Nazerene as a proper fiesta due to the fact that the January 9 observance celebrates the transfer of the image and not the liturgical "feast day" of the image. The proper liturgical commemoration of the Black Nazerene is on Good Friday. In 2021, the Basilica’s parochial vicar Fr. Douglas Badong explained that the Feast of the Black Nazerene is a proper term for the religious event, and could be called a fiesta as the event is similar to the typical Filipino festival.

The event is also colloquially referred to as "Nazareno" after the image itself, or the Traslación after the January 9 procession. The word “Traslación” is often corrupted to the incorrect "translacion".

Traslación 

The Traslación procession is taken from the Spanish term for translation, referring to "passage" or "movement".

Every January 9, the Traslación of the Black Nazarene (commemorating the "solemn transfer" of the image's copy from San Nicolás de Tolentino in Intramuros to Quiapo) makes its way along the streets of Quiapo, with attendees reaching up to 220 thousand devotees. In recent years a persistent misconception has the Traslación being repeatedly referred to (by the media as well as unscrupulous politicians) as mostly the "Feast of the Black Nazarene" (Pistá ng Itím na Nazareno), and sometimes the "Feast of Quiapo" (Pistá ng Quiapo), which despite the chaotic yet festive atmosphere are far from correct: the Black Nazarene's liturgical commemoration is on Good Friday (the second date of the year on which the image is processed). The basilica's parochial feast day, meanwhile, is on June 24 (concurrent with Manila Day) – the birthday of its titular, John the Baptist.

In recent years, the processional route was altered due to a rise in accidents, to afford other neighbourhoods off the traditional route a chance to participate, and because of structural deficiencies in nearby bridges. It is normally only a school holiday for the schools near the processional route, but for the first time in the city's history, Mayor of Manila Joseph Estrada in 2014 declared the day a special non-working holiday due to the impassability of some thoroughfares and projected congestion in others.

As per custom, the Black Nazarene leaves the Minor Basilica a day or two before the annual procession, either in a public fashion or clandestinely. Since 2016, the procession begins at around 05:30 AM PST (GMT+8) after a solemn Midnight Mass at the Quirino Grandstand (usually presided by the Rector of the Minor Basilica but with the Archbishop of Manila preaching the sermon), followed hours later by Morning Prayer of the Liturgy of the Hours. It ends in Quiapo in late night of the same day or early the following morning, depending on how long the image has travelled. Some participants choose to wait for the image inside the Minor Basilica to greet it, while most devotees walk throughout the whole processional route. All devotees wear maroon and yellow like the image, and they walk barefoot as a form of penance and in emulation of Christ's walk to Golgotha. Authorities estimate that over 500,000 devotees strode barefoot in the 2013 procession, which whole almost week long event was attended by 9 million people. Attendees include families of devotees, tourists, and members of devotees' associations throughout the country and overseas, all carrying their long estandartes (religious gonfalon) usually coloured maroon or white and embroidered in gold and emblazoned with the image and the association name.

The Black Nazarene is processed upon the Ándas, and traditionally only men were permitted to be mamámasán ("bearers"), the devotees pulling the wheeled Ándas by its two large ropes. In recent years, female mamámasán have been allowed to participate, with pregnant women barred for safety reasons. There is also the custom of vying to touch the Kanang Balikat, or the rope to the side of the image's right shoulder. Folk belief holds it to possesses great sanctity, as it is closer to imitating the image bearing the Cross.

Marshals from the Minor Basilica, known as the Hijos del Nazareno ("Sons of the Nazarene"), form an honour guard around the image, and are the only people permitted to ride the Ándas for the duration of the Traslación. The Hijos – distinguishes from maroon-clad devotees by their yellow and white shirts – have the primary task of protecting the icon from damage and directing the mamámasán in front and behind using hand gestures, voice commands (sometimes through a megaphone), and whistle signals. In addition, they help devotees clamber up onto the Ándas to briefly touch the icon's cross, and wipe the image with cloths tossed at them. The wiping of cloth on the image, which is also done during the Pahalík ("kissing") ritual held the eve of the Traslación, follows the folk belief that cloth can absorb the powers of a holy object (usually and specifically its curative abilities). This sanctity-through-contact descends from the ancient custom of ex brandea (cloth wiped on the bodies or tombs of the Twelve Apostles), itself part of the wider category of Third-class relics.

No Traslación were held in 2021, 2022, and 2023 due to the COVID-19 pandemic. Instead, Padungaw ("viewing") of the Black Nazarene, masses were heard repeatedly in Quiapo Church and "Walk of Faith" procession is introduced this 2023 as alternative to yearly traditional Traslación. It is estimated around 88,000 devotees joined the procession, started from Quirino Grandstand at Luneta Park and then finished in the Minor Basilica of the Black Nazarene or commonly known as Quiapo Church.

Injuries and casualties
The Traslación is also notorious for the casualties that result from the jostling and congestion of the crowds pulling the Ándas. The injuries and even deaths of devotees are brought upon by one or several factors including heat, fatigue, or being trampled upon by the crowd.

Length
The 2012 Traslación is currently the longest in the image's recorded history as it ended 22 hours after leaving the Grandstand, arriving at Plaza Miranda around 05:15 AM PST the next day (January 10). The procession took longer than usual since the wheels of the Ándas broke early on at a point near Manila Hotel, while the rope broke some distance away near Liwasang Bonifacio.

There were also reports of groups of devotees diverting the image from the previously defined route in order to pass by business establishments outside the traditional route. This illicit act was done to allow homes and businesses off the planned route to receive the good luck and blessings of the image.

La Mirata or the Dungaw Rite 
On January 9, 2014, the traditional Dungaw (a Tagalog calque of the rite's Spanish name Mirata, "to see" or "to view") was revived and reincorporated into the Traslación after the discovery of old documents attesting to its practise. The rite, which was discontinued in the early 1900s for still-unknown reasons, involves the Black Nazarene, coming from R. Hidalgo Street, being made to stop briefly at Plaza del Carmen, a square along the southwest flank of the neo-gothic Basílica Menor de San Sebastián, before proceeding towards Bilibid Viejo Street.

The resident Recollect priests remove the image of Our Lady of Mount Carmel from the principal niche of the retablo mayor, or use a replica which is termed its vicária. The image is dressed in its primera vestida (used only on the most solemn occasions) in its camarín, or private chamber. Only Augustinian nuns and other women may enter the camarín at this point; men, including priests, all exit as they are forbidden from watching the Virgin "change clothes". During the entire vesting process, the rosary is recited.

Once fully dressed in precious robes and regalia, the original image, which was given to the Recollects in 1617 by a Carmelite nunnery in Mexico City, is then solemnly and silently processed on its own small ándas to a temporary scaffold erected at the southwest face of the church. There, it is lifted up by several priests and attendants to "see" and "meet" the Black Nazarene as devotees fall silent. A Gospel lesson is followed by general intercessions, and several prayers (often the Lord's Prayer and the Hail Mary), are chanted fervently. The Basilica's bells are rung throughout the short prayer service. The presiding priests then shout "¡Viva Jesús Nazareno!" to which the crowd replies "¡Viva!" and "¡Viva Virgen del Carmen!" to which the customary reply is "¡Guapa!"; this cheer is done thrice. Shortly thereafter, the priests slowly turn the Virgin's image so that it "watches" the Black Nazarene and its procession depart the vicinity of Plaza del Carmen. The image of the Virgin is then returned to the high altar, or the replica returned to its proper place, while the choir sings the devotional hymn Nuestro Padre Jesús Nazareno.

Theologically, the Dungaw rite reflects the fourth Traditional Station of the Cross, where Christ meets his Mother, the Virgin Mary, en route to Golgotha, and reflects the closeness of Christ and his Mother. The rite is also seen as a "courtesy" of the Virgin's image towards the Black Nazarene, as the former's shrine is along the processional route.

Observances outside Manila

In the Philippines

Similar processions replicating the Traslación are also held on 9 January in other parts of the country. The largest of these is held in Cagayan de Oro, which uses an official replica of the image given by the Minor Basilica in 2009. It has since become a centre for the devotion in Mindanao.

On March 4, 2014, a replica of the Black Nazarene from Quiapo Church arrived at the Old Chapel of St. Rock the Healer Mission Center, Bishop's Compound, Brgy. Cawayan, Catarman, Northern Samar. Since then, many devotees across Northern Samar came to venerate the sacred image, especially on Fridays. At that time, the said mission center was constructing a bigger church.

On January 9, 2015, the first Traslación was held when the sacred image was solemnly transferred from the old church to the new and unfinished church building. Crowds not only from Northern Samar but all over the island attended.

On September 12, 2016, the newly-constructed church was blessed, dedicated, and consecrated by Luis Antonio Cardinal Tagle. The event was concelebrated by priests from Quiapo Church, Felomino G. Bactol, the Bishop of Naval, Bishop Emeritus Anghel Hobayan of the Diocese of Catarman, Emmanuel C. Trance, the Bishop of Catarman, the Mission Center's first administrator Rev. Fr. Alan Abalon and Mission Center's second administrator and rector Rev. Fr. Rico M. Manook. The event was attended by devotees from different dioceses in Eastern Visayas. During the ceremony, the Mission Center was elevated to the status of diocesan shrine, making it the first church in the Visayas to be declared a shrine in honor of this image.

On August 18, 2019, the said shrine became a parish, making it the first barangay-based parish in the whole Diocese of Catarman. Its current official name is St. Rock the Healer Parish, Diocesan Shrine of the Nuestro Padre Jesús Nazareno.

Other countries
Filipinos overseas have brought the tradition of a procession and Mass honoring of the Black Nazarene image to countries such as Australia and the United States. As in Quiapo, a copy of the image is paraded through the streets or within the parish bounds, with devotees reciting prayers in its wake.

In September 2012, a replica of the Black Nazarene was canonically enshrined at Saint Catherine of Siena Roman Catholic Parish in Reseda, California, United States. A procession in the United Arab Emirates made it the first Traslación in the Middle East on January 4, 2019, the first Friday of that month.

Transportation during Traslación
Travel within the City of Manila during the Traslación every January 9 might be difficult as heavy traffic is expected. Most jeepneys use alternate routes for the day to avoid the procession, thus creating additional travel time. Some public transport systems such as the Line 1, Line 2, and Line 3 provide free rides to devotees, who are easily identifiable as dressed in maroon and walking barefoot.

Traffic rerouting is implemented on the annual procession and the day before, and is enforced by the Manila Police District with reinforcements from the Philippine National Police and, since 2014, the Armed Forces of the Philippines and the Metropolitan Manila Development Authority. The Philippine Coast Guard guards stretches of the Pasig River along the Jones (since 2014), Quezon and MacArthur (until 2013) bridges to ensure the safe passage of the procession.

A similar scenario may be experienced by tourists and travellers in Cagayan de Oro and in Catarman, Northern Samar during the yearly processions of the sacred image, as well as in other towns and cities where replica images are brought out in procession on this day.

References

Festivals in Metro Manila
Culture in Manila
January observances